2000 Years Later is a 1969 American comedy film written and directed by Bert Tenzer and starring Terry-Thomas, Edward Everett Horton, Pat Harrington, Jr., Lisa Seagram, John Abbott and John Myhers. It was released  by Warner Bros.-Seven Arts on March 11, 1969.

Plot

Cast    
Terry-Thomas as Goodwyn
Edward Everett Horton as Evermore
Pat Harrington, Jr. as Franchot
Lisa Seagram as Cindy
John Abbott as Gregorius
John Myhers as Air Force General
Tom Melody as Senator
Myrna Ross as Miss Forever
Monti Rock III as Tomorrow's Leader
Murray Roman as Superdude
Michael Christian as The Piston Kid
Casey Kasem as Disk Jockey
Bert Tenzer as Mercury's Voice
Rudi Gernreich as himself

References

External links
 

1969 films
1960s English-language films
American comedy films
1969 comedy films
Warner Bros. films
Films scored by Stu Phillips
1960s American films